The discography of American new wave band Talking Heads consists of eight studio albums, two live albums, eight compilation albums, one remix album, four video album, 31 singles, and 15 music videos.

Albums

Studio albums

Live albums

Compilation albums

Remix albums

Video albums

Singles

Music videos

Notes

References

External links
 Official website
 Talking Heads at AllMusic
 
 
 Entry at 45cat.com

Discography
Rock music group discographies
New wave discographies
Discographies of American artists